Reynaers Aluminium is a European developer of aluminium products for the building sector. The company also provides support for architects, fabricators, solar installers, project developers, investors and end users. The company, with its headquarters in Duffel, Belgium, employed over 1,500 workers in 37 countries worldwide as of 2014 and exports to 72 countries on 5 continents. In 2013 Reynaers achieved a turnover of 317 million euros.

See also

 List of companies of Belgium

References

External links
 Piscinas XXI
 Arte y Cemento
 Arte y Cemento
 Arte y Cemento
 Piscinas XXI
 Arte y Cemento
 Arte y Cemento
 Governance in het familiebedrijf – Jozef Lievens

Aluminium companies of Belgium
Building materials companies
Belgian brands
Construction and civil engineering companies established in 1965
Manufacturing companies established in 1965
Companies based in Antwerp Province
Duffel